Charles Francis may refer to:

 Charles Spencer Francis (1853–1911), former United States Ambassador to Greece
 Charles Robert Francis (1875–1946), U.S. Marine private who received the Medal of Honor 
 Charles Cooper Francis (1884–1956), cathedral organist, who served at Peterborough Cathedral
 Charles Francis (politician) (1924–2009), Australian politician
 Charles Francis (swimmer) (born 1988), Canadian swimmer
 Charles Francis (cricketer) (1851–1925), English cricketer

See also